Figure skating at the 2013 Winter Universiade included an ice dancing event for senior level skaters. The short dance was held on December 13 and the free dance on December 14, 2013.

Results

Panel of Judges

References

Figure skating at the 2013 Winter Universiade